Potassium metabisulfite, K2S2O5, also known as potassium pyrosulfite, is a white crystalline powder with a pungent odour. It is mainly used as an antioxidant or chemical sterilant.  As a disulfite, it is chemically very similar to sodium metabisulfite, with which it is sometimes used interchangeably.  Potassium metabisulfite has a monoclinic crystal structure.

Preparation and reactions

Potassium metabisulfite can be prepared by treating a solution of potassium hydroxide with sulfur dioxide.  
2 SO2  +  2 KOH  →  K2S2O5  +  H2O

It decomposes at 190 °C, yielding potassium sulfite and sulfur dioxide:
K2S2O5 → K2SO3 + SO2

Uses
It is used as a food additive, also known as E224. It is restricted in use and may cause allergic reactions in some sensitive persons.

Wine
Potassium metabisulfite is a common wine or must additive, in which it forms sulfur dioxide (SO2). Sulfur dioxide is a disinfectant. It also acts as a potent antioxidant, protecting both the color and delicate flavors of wine.

A high dose would be 3 grams of potassium metabisulfite per six-gallon bucket of must (yielding roughly 75 ppm of SO2) prior to fermentation; then 6 grams per six-gallon bucket (150 ppm of SO2) at bottling.  Some countries regulate the SO2  content of wines.

Winemaking equipment is sanitized by spraying with a 1% SO2 (2 tsp potassium metabisulfite per L) solution.

Beer
Potassium metabisulfite is sometimes used in the brewing industry to inhibit the growth of wild bacteria and fungi. This step is called 'stabilizing'.  It is also used to neutralize monochloramine from tap water. It is used both by homebrewers and commercial brewers alike. It is not used as much for brewing beer, because the wort is almost always boiled, which kills most microorganisms.

Other uses
Potassium metabisulfite is sometimes added to lemon juice as a preservative.
Potassium metabisulfite is used in the textile industry for dyeing and cotton printing.
Potassium metabisulfite is sometimes used to precipitate gold from solution in aqua regia (as an alternative to sodium sulfite).
It is a component of certain photographic developers and solutions used in photographic fixing.
It is used as a bleaching agent in the production of coconut cream.
It is used in some pickles as a preservative.
It is used in tint etching iron-based metal samples for microstructural analysis. 
It is used in Aam papad as a preservative.

Safety
Potassium metabisulfite can irritate skin, eyes, and respiratory tract.

See also
 Campden tablet

References

Metabisulfites
Potassium compounds
Photographic chemicals
E-number additives